Hiatt is a surname. Notable people with the surname include:

Brenda Hiatt, American author
Fred Hiatt, American journalist
Jack Hiatt (born 1942), American baseball player
John Hiatt (born 1952), American musician
Kevin Hiatt, fictional television character on The Shield
Lester Hiatt (1931–2008), Australian anthropologist
Phil Hiatt (born 1969), American baseball player
Ruth Hiatt (1906–1994), actress
Shana Hiatt (born 1975), model
Louis Hiatt (born 1984), An entrepreneur

See also
Hiatt, Missouri, a community in the United States
Hiatt & Co. A defunct UK based handcuff manufacturer best known for their Speedcuffs.